Paul Edward Koelliker (born March 12, 1943) has been a general authority of the Church of Jesus Christ of Latter-day Saints (LDS Church) since 2005.

Biography 

Koelliker was born in Pittsburg, California. As a young man, he was an LDS Church missionary in West Berlin, Germany. He received a bachelor's degree in business administration from the University of Utah in 1969. Koelliker and his wife, Ann Neilson, are the parents of seven children.

Koelliker's professional career was largely spent working for the LDS Church, including as secretary to the Presiding Bishopric and as managing director of three church departments (Priesthood, Member and Statistical Records, and Temple departments). He was managing director of the Temple Department from 1997 to 2005, during the large increase in the number of temples built during LDS Church president Gordon B. Hinckley's tenure.

In the LDS Church, Koelliker has been an elders quorum president, bishop, and president of the Salt Lake Hillside Stake. After being appointed to the First Quorum of the Seventy in 2005, he served as Executive Director of the Temple Department and as both a counselor and as president of the church's Africa Southeast Area. In 2011, he was appointed as an Assistant Executive Director in the Family History Department. In October 2013, Koelliker was released from the First Quorum of the Seventy and designated an emeritus general authority.

References 

 Shaun D. Stahle, Orderliness crucial quality for Elder Koelliker, Church News, May 28, 2005. Retrieved 22 August 2015.
 "Elder Paul E. Koelliker Of the Seventy," Liahona, May 2005, p. 124
 2008 Deseret Morning News Church Almanac (Salt Lake City, Utah: Deseret Morning News, 2007) p. 48

External links 
"General Authorities: Elder Paul E. Koelliker"
 Grampa Bill's G.A. Pages: Paul E. Koelliker

1943 births
20th-century Mormon missionaries
American Mormon missionaries in Germany
American general authorities (LDS Church)
Latter Day Saints from California
Latter Day Saints from Utah
Living people
Members of the First Quorum of the Seventy (LDS Church)
People from Pittsburg, California
People from Salt Lake City
Religious leaders from California
University of Utah alumni